Thelikada is a rural village situated in Galle District, in the southern part of Sri Lanka.

The Gin River (Gin Ganga) flows near the village. Also the Gin Dam (Bund) is lying inside the village. The Wakwella Bridge (Wakwalla Palama) is nearby.

It is a 2.30 hours drive from the Capital. Access points to the village from Galle Road are Hickkaduwa, Rathgama, Boossa, Pintaliya, Gintota and Galle.

There are over 2,000 residents in the village. Thelikada Sunandaramaya is an old temple which can be seen some old drawings over 100 years old Wall painting.  Also there is a school called Thelikada Maha Vidyalaya. Currently there are over 300 students and 30 teachers. Thelikada Post Office, Sanasa Bank, and Thelikada Police station provide services to the village.

Since the nineteenth century, brickmaking has been a key local industry although today its importance has declined with sand mining replacing it to a degree. Another important economic activity is agriculture, with cultivation of rubber, coconut, tea, cinnamon and rice.

References

Populated places in Southern Province, Sri Lanka